Back Catalogue is a compilation album by Front 242, released in 1987, and rereleased in 1992.

It is a collection of singles and other miscellaneous tracks, recorded from 1982 to 1985.

Track listing

References

1987 compilation albums
Front 242 albums